Brandt House may refer to:

Brandt House (Lafayette, Louisiana), listed on the National Register of Historic Places in Lafayette Parish, Louisiana
Dr. Albert M. and Evelyn M. Brandt House, Bismarck, North Dakota, listed on the National Register of Historic Places in Burleigh County, North Dakota
Brandt House (Watertown, Wisconsin), listed on the National Register of Historic Places in Jefferson County, Wisconsin

See also
Brandt Hotel, Alma, Kansas, listed on the National Register of Historic Places in Wabaunsee County, Kansas